In music, Op. 97 stands for Opus number 97. Compositions that are assigned this number include:

 Beethoven – Piano Trio, Op. 97
 Dvořák – String Quintet No. 3
 Schumann – Symphony No. 3
 Shostakovich/Atovmyan – The Gadfly Suite